Mykola (or Nikolai) Ivanovych Fedorenko (born 31 July 1955 in Ordzhonikidze, Ukraine) is a retired Soviet football player and a current Ukrainian football coach.

Honours
 Soviet Top League winner: 1983.
 Soviet Cup winner: 1980.

International career
Fedorenko made his debut for USSR on 26 March 1980 in a friendly against Bulgaria. He scored a goal in his second (and last) game for USSR – a friendly against Sweden on 29 April 1980.

In 1979 Fedorenko played couple of games for Ukraine at the Spartakiad of the Peoples of the USSR.

References

External links
  Profile

1955 births
Living people
People from Pokrov, Ukraine
Soviet footballers
Soviet Union international footballers
Ukrainian footballers
Ukrainian football managers
Soviet Top League players
FC Shakhtar Donetsk players
FC Dnipro players
FC Elektrometalurh-NZF Nikopol players
FC Zirka Kropyvnytskyi players
Ukrainian Premier League managers
FC Zirka Kropyvnytskyi managers
FC Sirius Kryvyi Rih managers
FC Krystal Kherson managers
FC Dnipro managers
FC Tytan Armyansk managers
FC Shakhtar-2 Donetsk managers
Association football midfielders
Association football forwards
Sportspeople from Dnipropetrovsk Oblast